John Bernard Gordon (born May 30, 1939) is an American jazz trombonist.

Early life and education 
Gordon was born in New York City. He studied at Juilliard School and played with Buddy Johnson and Ray Draper in the 1950s.

Career 
Gordon worked with Lionel Hampton in 1961 and 1962 and with Lloyd Price and Sam Rivers later in the 1960s. In the 1970s, he played with Charles Tolliver, Clark Terry, Count Basie, Howard McGhee, and Frank Foster, as well as with Hampton again; he continued working with Hampton until 1989. He also led his own ensembles in the late 1970s, with sidemen including Tolliver, Roland Alexander, Lisle Atkinson, Stanley Cowell, and Andrew Cyrille.

After leaving Hampton, Gordon played in Al Grey's ensemble, Trombone Summit, and founded a group called Trombones Incorporated with Fred Joiner. When Joiner left the group in the early 1990s, Gordon became its leader and changed its name to Trombones Unlimited. In the 1990s he also played with Slide Hampton, Josh Roseman, Lafayette Harris, Martin Winder, Curtis Fuller, and Thilo Berg.

Gordon worked for several decades as a session musician for recordings and has also performed in pit orchestras for Broadway musicals.

References
Gary W. Kennedy, "John Gordon". The New Grove Dictionary of Jazz. 2nd edition, ed. Barry Kernfeld.

American jazz trombonists
Male trombonists
Musicians from New York City
1939 births
Living people
Jazz musicians from New York (state)
21st-century trombonists
21st-century American male musicians
American male jazz musicians